The following is a list of city squares and parks in Montevideo:

Squares 
 Plaza de la Democracia (Tres Cruces)
 Plaza de Cagancha, or Plaza Libertad (Centro)
 Plaza de la Constitición, or Plaza Matríz (Ciudad Vieja)
 Plaza España (Ciudad Vieja)
 Plaza Fabini, or Plaza del Entrevero (Centro)
 Plaza Independencia (Ciudad Vieja)
 Plaza Isabel la Católica (Centro)
 Plaza Tomás Gomensoro (Pocitos)
 Plaza de los Treinta y Tres Orientales, or Plaza Artola (Cordón)
 Plaza Zabala (Ciudad Vieja)

Squares that are also parks 
 Plaza or Parque Liber Seregni (Cordón) 
 Plaza de la Armada or Plaza Virgilio (Punta Gorda)

Parks 
 Parque Batlle (Parque Batlle)
 Parque Capurro (Capurro)
 Parque Lineal Arquitecto Eugenio Baroffio (Punta Gorda)
 Parque Fernando Garcia (Bañados de Carrasco)
 Parque General Lavalleja (Carrasco)
 Parque Lecocq (Los Bulevares / Santiago Vasquez)
 Parque Prado (Prado)
 Parque Fructuoso Rivera (Punta Gorda)
 Parque Rodó (Punta Carretas)
 Parque Dr. Juan Zorrilla de San Martin (Punta Carretas)
 Parque Dr. Carlos Vaz Ferreira (Casabo)

Geography of Montevideo